Tulips Shall Grow is a 1942 American animated short film in the Puppetoons series, directed by George Pal and starring Rex Ingram and Victor Jory. It was released by Paramount Pictures and originally photographed in 3-strip Technicolor. It later became the black-and-white edition by National Telefilm Associates.

Plot
A Dutch boy and girl's idyllic existence is destroyed when they are overrun by a group of Nazi-like mechanical men called "The Screwballs", who lay waste to everything they touch. The Screwballs are later destroyed by a thunderstorm (the rain of which causes them to rust) and the boy and girl's idyllic life resumes.

Reception
The cartoon was nominated for the Oscar for Best Short Subject, Cartoons. In 1997, the film was selected for preservation in the United States National Film Registry by the Library of Congress as being "culturally, historically, or aesthetically significant".

It was also included in the 1987 compilation film The Puppetoon Movie.

References

External links
 Tulips Shall Grow essay by Mark Mayerson at National Film Registry
 Tulips Shall Grow essay by Daniel Eagan in America's Film Legacy: The Authoritative Guide to the Landmark Movies in the National Film Registry, A&C Black, 2010 , pages 346-347
 
 
 "Tulips Shall Grow" short film at Europa Film Treasures site
 

1942 animated films
1942 films
1940s American animated films
1940s animated short films
American animated short films
Animated films without speech
American World War II propaganda shorts
Short films directed by George Pal
Films set in the Netherlands
Netherlands in fiction
United States National Film Registry films
Paramount Pictures short films
Puppetoons
Stop-motion animated short films